A by-election was held in the Dáil Éireann Cork South-Central constituency in Ireland on 10 November 1994. It followed the resignation of Pat Cox Teachta Dála (TD) in June 1994 on his re-election to the European Parliament.

The election was won by former TD and future Minister Hugh Coveney of Fine Gael.

Among the candidates were Cork City Councillor and former and future TD John Dennehy, Cork City Councillor, future Senator and future TD Dan Boyle, former and future Senator Brendan Ryan and Cork City Councillor Joe O'Flynn.

On the same day, a by-election took place in Cork North-Central.

Result

See also
List of Dáil by-elections
Dáil constituencies

References

External links
https://www.electionsireland.org/result.cfm?election=1992B&cons=61
http://irelandelection.com/election.php?elecid=42&constitid=22&electype=2

1994 in Irish politics
1994 elections in the Republic of Ireland
27th Dáil
By-elections in the Republic of Ireland
Elections in County Cork
November 1994 events in Europe